Enclave: The Ottawa Women's Monument is a public monument that honours the lives of local women and girls murdered by men between 1990 and 2000. It is located in Minto Park, off of Elgin Street, in Ottawa, Ontario, Canada. It was built in 1992 by the Women's Urgent Action Committee in reaction to the Montreal Massacre of December 6, 1989, and a patriarchal climate of violence against women.

History 
Upon the brutal murder of Pamella Behrendt by her husband, the Women's Urgent Action Committee was created. They decided to use Minto Park as a spot for her vigil in summer 1990. Unveiled December 6, 1992, on the National Day of Remembrance and Action on Violence Against Women, Enclave was created by artist C. J. Fleury and landscape architect Mary Leigh Faught, led by the Committee. The group continues to hold vigils for Ottawa women at the memorial, and there are annual gatherings on December 6, the anniversary of the École Polytechnique massacre. The Committee also planted trees in memorial of murdered and abused women and girls. 

The last engraving was made in 2000, when the name of Sandra Campbell was replaced with "Jane Doe" due to legal issues, causing controversy and contributing to the dissolution of the committee. Since then, no official changes have been made to the monument though many people wish to have more names added.

Description 
The central piece of the monument is a  uncut upright granite stone. On its rough surface is a smooth indented double-pointed oval, or yoni, containing engravings. The main engraving consists of the same text in English and French. In English it reads:

Illustrations of a three-swirl symbol (or triskele), the phases of the moon, waves, and female figures also appear on the stone's face. Surrounding this central stone are 37 smaller stones, placed in an open spiral, each engraved with the name of a woman killed by an act of violence perpetrated by a man. The Ottawa Women's Monument is located in the middle of Minto Park, in line with the bust of Argentinian general José de San Martín, which is situated on the Elgin Street side of the park.

Symbolism 
Enclave: The Ottawa Women's Monument is an instalment that incorporates feminine symbolic imagery. The boulder was chosen to call to mind the visual of hips without having to cut or modify in stone to make it look a particular way. This was important in its design so as to be easily identifiable as naturally female and not sculpted to fit certain ideas of femininity. The triskele spiral engraved at the top is a neolithic symbol that signifies continuity and references ancient divine femininity. The round arrangement of the stones is meant to evoke a sense of cyclical life, death and rebirth, openness, and to encourage people to enter the walls of the enclave and engage with the memories of the women mourned there. The shape of the boulder and the polished pointed oval also reflects yonic imagery. Additionally, the memorial's geographical location between Ottawa's courthouse and the police station can act to remind visitors of the systemic issues at play in violence against women and the lack of attention given to addressing them.

Women honoured 
The women and girls memorialized are:

Patricia Allen, 31, was killed in November 1991 by her husband. Shot with crossbow in a downtown Ottawa street.
Carole Poulin Begley, 51, was killed in March 1996. Stabbed 14 times by husband. Police were often called by neighbours but no action was taken.
Pamella Behrendt, 55, was killed in June 1990 by her husband with a chainsaw. Mother of three.
Sylvie Boucher, 38, was killed in November 1996 by her husband. Double-murder suicide with her 12-year-old son.
Reva Bowers, 30, was killed in April 1991. Shot by estranged husband outside her home. He then shot himself in front of a group of schoolchildren.
Esther Carlisle, 80, was killed in 1997.
Juliet Cuenco, stone removed. Choked and beaten to death in April 1993 by husband.
Micheline Cuerrier, 26, was killed in 1998. Throat slashed by boyfriend.
Kelli Davis, 33, was killed in 1996 by her husband.
Victoria Debes, 58, killed 1998. Stabbed and struck with a rolling pin by her husband who also stabbed their son.
Melanie Desroches, 13, killed in summer 1993. Beaten to death by a teenager from school.
Jane Doe, previously the marker for Sandra Campbell.
Louise Ellis, 46, was killed by her partner in 1995. Was missing for three months before her remains were found.
Rachel Favreau, 21, shot by her partner. Mother of an infant.
Sophie Filion, 23, was found in garbage bags in December 1993. Died of strangulation. No arrest was made.
Thelma Fokuhl, 66, was beaten to death by her partner in December 1992.
Lori Goodfellow, was killed in September 1992 by her husband who also killed his second wife.
Sherri Lee Guy, 20, killed in April 1995, shot by her ex-partner. Reports to police that day of threats by ex not taken seriously. Mother of an infant.
Lori Heath, 34, was killed in September 1993, throat cut by her partner whom she was separating from. Mother of a 13-year-old.
Bernita Herron, 36, body found in a duffel bag in a parking garage. No arrest was made.
Fengzhi Huang, 36, was killed in 2000.
Karena Janveau, 24, was killed by her boyfriend in 1999. Perpetrator attempted to conceal the body in garbage bags in the basement.
Carmen Jeannot, 43, was killed in 1995. Shot by husband alongside their 12-year-old daughter.
Barbara Lanthier, 46, was killed in 1994 by her husband. Drowned in car in Mississippi River.
Anne Laurin, 37, was killed in 1997 by gunshot.
Marie Fernande Levesque, 70, was killed in 1994 by her husband in a murder-suicide.
Carrie Mancuso, 32, was killed in September 1995. Strangled to death. No arrest was made.
Sharon Mohamed, 14, was killed in June 1991 by her mother's boyfriend who threw boiling water on and stabbed her and her mother.
Mary Ann Paquette, 39, was killed on December 25, 1995. Strangled by husband.
Lillian Pilon, 42, was killed in July 1990. Stabbed to death by husband. Mother to one.
Tammy Proulx, 34, was killed in 1997 by a man she had a relationship with.
Vanessa Ritchie, 24, triple-murder suicide of Vanessa and her two children by her husband in 1995.
Melinda Sheppitt, 16, was killed in September 1990.
Joan St. Jean, 53, was killed in April 1998 in a suspected murder-suicide.
Barbara Teske, 38, was killed by her husband in 1998.
Charmaine Thompson, 23, killed by boyfriend while pregnant.
Angela Tong, 22, was killed winter of 1997. Stabbed to death, put in a hockey bag and left in the snow.
Cornelia Wyss, 24, killed in 1998, strangled by her husband in Switzerland. Mother of two sons.

Controversy 
In 2000, legal issues surrounding the accusation of one of the women's alleged murderers took place. This resulted in the Committee being required to remove the name of Sandra Campbell because her husband's murder charges were stayed. Instead of removing the stone, they replaced her name with "Jane Doe" to reflect the countless women who have disappeared, and the people responsible who have not been brought to justice by the legal system.

Another controversy surrounding the monument is the claim that it is sexist in its targeting of men as perpetrators. Some feminists and members of the Committee were also concerned with its specifying men as agents of violence against women because they thought it could direct attention away from the victims.

The essentialized female imagery is also a subject of debate as it is seen by some as exclusionary in its portrayal of a particular kind of womanhood and its erasure of the specific struggles with gendered violence faced by indigenous women and girls.

See also 

 Anti-monumentalism

References

Monuments and memorials in Ottawa
Monuments and memorials to women
1992 establishments in Ontario
1992 sculptures
Women and death
Women in Ontario
1990s in Ottawa